Elizabeth Nuttall  (née Lynch, formerly McColgan; born 24 May 1964) is a Scottish former middle-distance and long-distance track and road-running athlete. She won the gold medal for the 10,000 metres at the 1991 World Championships, and a silver medal over the same distance at the 1988 Olympic Games. She was also a two-time gold medalist over the distance at the Commonwealth Games, as well as winning the 1992 World Half Marathon Championships, 1991 New York City Marathon, 1992 Tokyo Marathon and 1996 London Marathon. Her 10,000 metres best of 30:57.07 set in 1991, moved her to second on the world all-time list at that time and stood as the Scottish record until 2022, when it was broken by her daughter Eilish McColgan. Her marathon best of 2:26:52 in 1997, stood as the Scottish record until 2019.

Early life
Born Elizabeth Lynch, she grew up in the Whitfield area of Dundee and was a pupil of St Saviour's RC High School.

She joined her local athletics club, Hawkhill Harriers, aged 12 on the advice of her PE teacher Phil Kearns Coached by Harry Bennett, she soon discovered a talent for distance running and won her first UK titles aged 18. Following Bennett's death, McColgan coached herself in preparation for the Commonwealth Games in Edinburgh in 1986. From 1987 to 1989 McColgan was coached by John Anderson, including at the 1988 Olympics, after which she coached herself to the world 10,000m title and to wins in the London, New York and Tokyo marathons. She then met Grete Waitz, who coached her from 1992 to her retirement in 1996.

Athletics career
At the 1986 Commonwealth Games in Edinburgh, as Liz Lynch, she took the gold medal in the 10,000 metres, finishing nearly 12 seconds ahead of the nearest competitor and giving the host country its only gold medal in athletics. Earlier that year, she had won the NCAA Division I Indoor Track and Field Championships in the mile representing the University of Alabama. In 1987, she won a silver medal at the World Cross Country Championships in Warsaw representing Scotland (Great Britain would not send a unified team to the World Cross until 1988). She finished behind Annette Sergent of France but ahead of Ingrid Kristiansen. In September, she improved the UK 10,000m record to 31:19.82 while finishing fifth at the World Championships in Rome, in a race won by Kristiansen.

In 1988, now competing as Liz McColgan, she improved her own UK record with 31:06.99 in July to defeat Kristiansen in Oslo. Almost three months later, she ran 31:08.44 to win an Olympic silver medal in the inaugural women's 10,000 metres at the Seoul Olympics. She was defeated by the Soviet Union's Olga Bondarenko. McColgan won silver in the 3,000 metres at the World Indoor Championships in 1989. In January 1990, she became the only Scot to successfully defend a Commonwealth title at the 1990 games in Auckland, New Zealand, when she again took the gold in the 10,000 metres, as well as bronze in the 3,000 metres. She missed the rest of the 1990 season due to pregnancy, giving birth to her daughter (future Olympic athlete) Eilish in November. Nike dropped her the moment she told them she was pregnant.

Just six weeks after her daughter Eilish was born, she contested an international 5 km race in Florida and won a bronze medal at the 1991 World Cross Country Championships. In June 1991, she ran her lifetime best for the 10,000 m with 30:57.07 in Hengelo, becoming only the third woman to run under 31 minutes, moving to second on the world all-time list behind Kristiansen and narrowly ahead of Bondarenko. This stood as the Scottish record until it was broken by Eilish in 2022. In August 1991, she won gold in the 10,000 metres at the World Championships in Tokyo, Japan. In November of that year at the New York City Marathon, her first marathon, she won with a time of 2:27.23, breaking the record for a debut marathon by three minutes.

In March 1992, McColgan struggled to a 41st-place finish at the World Cross Country Championships in Boston. Then, in the summer, she finished fifth in the 10,000m final at the Barcelona Olympics. In September, she won the inaugural World Half Marathon Championships, where she also helped the British team claim the silver medal in the team competition. Two months later, she won the Tokyo International Women's Marathon.

After more than two years struggling with injuries, McColgan finished fifth in the 1995 London Marathon and sixth in the 10,000m final at the 1995 World Championships in Gothenburg. In 1996, she won the London Marathon in a time of 2 hours, 27 minutes and 54 seconds, before finishing 16th in the marathon at the Atlanta Olympics. She finished second in the London Marathons of 1997 and 1998, running her career-best time of 2:26:52 in 1997. She gave her medal to a youngster in the crowd after the 1997 event.

McColgan retired from competing in August 2001 when she fractured a bone in her foot while training for selection for the 2002 Commonwealth Games. However, she returned in 2004 to win the Scottish Indoor Championships 3000 metres (in 9:31). In 2007, she ran the London Marathon, finishing 25th in 2:50:38. She also completed the 2010 New York Marathon in 3:10:54. In 2017, she completed the inaugural Stirling Scottish Marathon in 3:18:32.

Personal life
In 1987 she married Northern Irish athlete Peter McColgan; they had five children together - Eilish, Martin, Eamonn, Kieran and Orla. The couple separated in November 2010 and finalised their divorce in March 2013. On 18 January 2014, McColgan married John Nuttall, a coach who has worked as head of endurance coaching for British Athletics and now coaches in Qatar, in the process becoming step-mother to Nuttall's son, para-athlete Luke Nuttall and daughter, British international athlete Hannah Nuttall.

McColgan's eldest daughter, Eilish, is also a distance runner. Eilish broke her mother's Scottish 10,000 metre record in 2022, and emulated her mother by winning the 10,000 metres at the 2022 Commonwealth Games.

Awards
In December 1991, McColgan appeared on This Is Your Life and was voted BBC Sports Personality of the Year. She was appointed a Member of the Order of the British Empire for services to athletics in 1992 and inducted to the Scottish Sports Hall of Fame in 2004.

Achievements

References

External links
 

1964 births
Living people
Scottish people of Irish descent
Sportspeople from Dundee
British female long-distance runners
Scottish female marathon runners
Scottish female long-distance runners
Olympic athletes of Great Britain
Athletes (track and field) at the 1988 Summer Olympics
Athletes (track and field) at the 1992 Summer Olympics
Athletes (track and field) at the 1996 Summer Olympics
Scottish Olympic medallists
Commonwealth Games gold medallists for Scotland
Commonwealth Games bronze medallists for Scotland
Commonwealth Games medallists in athletics
Athletes (track and field) at the 1986 Commonwealth Games
Athletes (track and field) at the 1990 Commonwealth Games
World Athletics Championships athletes for Great Britain
World Athletics Championships medalists
World Athletics Half Marathon Championships winners
New York City Marathon female winners
London Marathon female winners
BBC Sports Personality of the Year winners
Members of the Order of the British Empire
People educated at St Saviour's Roman Catholic High School
Medalists at the 1988 Summer Olympics
Olympic silver medallists for Great Britain
Olympic silver medalists in athletics (track and field)
Recipients of the Association of International Marathons and Distance Races Best Marathon Runner Award
World Athletics Indoor Championships medalists
World Athletics Championships winners
20th-century Scottish women
21st-century Scottish women
Medallists at the 1986 Commonwealth Games
Medallists at the 1990 Commonwealth Games